The C30T class is an old class of steam locomotives rebuilt from 30 class tank engines by Clyde Engineering and Eveleigh Railway Workshops for the New South Wales Government Railways of Australia.

History

Following the electrification of the Sydney inner suburban lines from 1926, 77 of the 30 class 4-6-4 tank locomotives were converted to tender type. This was achieved by cutting off the frames at the rear of the cab and removing the side tanks. There was no need to build tenders as there were a number on hand from scrapped locomotives or from locomotives where the original tenders had been replaced, notably 50 class locomotives.

The first locomotive to be converted was Engine No. 3088 which was delivered by Clyde Engineering on 22 August 1928. This company delivered a total of 10 conversions of these engines, the remainder being carried out at the New South Wales Government Railways' Eveleigh Railway Workshops. All of the engines were completed by July 1933. On conversion, the suffix 'T' was added to their numbers, on official correspondence only.  The numbers were not altered on the locomotives.

Between September 1940 to April 1957, 28 engines were fitted with superheaters. This work included fitting new cylinders with piston valves and extended smokeboxes. Most of the 28 superheated C30 Tank Engines received riveted on 'drumhead' extensions to their smokeboxes. Some engines were given entirely new extended smokeboxes fully supported by the frames, giving these few a more modern, purposeful look. Superheated locomotives had the further suffix 'S' to their numbers, on official correspondence only.

In their heyday, they could be found working almost every light branch line in New South Wales. Even in the final years of steam power, they could still be found well spread over the state in such places as Temora, Griffith, Cowra, Dubbo and Narrabri West.

The first was withdrawn in December 1958 (3126T) with the last (3090TS) withdrawn in August 1972. Seven engines of the class survive into preservation.

Preservation

Gallery

References

30T
4-6-0 locomotives
Beyer, Peacock locomotives
Railway locomotives introduced in 1928
Clyde Engineering locomotives
Standard gauge locomotives of Australia